John Gray (April 28, 1937 – September 23, 2020) was a Canadian journalist and author whose work includes Paul Martin: The Power of Ambition, a biography with an emphasis on Martin's lifelong quest to be Prime Minister. A former journalist with the Ottawa Citizen,  Gray also had many roles in 20 years of work for The Globe and Mail, including writer, editor, foreign correspondent, and Ottawa bureau chief. He won three National Newspaper Awards.

He was married to journalist and CBC Radio broadcaster Elizabeth Gray, née Binks.

References 

Sarah Murdoch, "John Anthony Morgan Gray", Globe and Mail December 18, 2020

Canadian male journalists
Canadian male non-fiction writers
Living people
1937 births